Kaghazkonan may refer to:
Kaghazkonan District
Kaghazkonan-e Markazi Rural District
Kaghazkonan-e Shomali Rural District